Rayan Salim Nasraoui Soulie (born 27 June 2003) is a professional footballer who plays as a left-back for French  club Nîmes. Born in France, he is a youth international for Tunisia.

Club career
Nasraoui is a youth product of Nîmes, and worked his way up their youth categories until debuting for their reserves in 2021. He made his professional debut with Nîmes as a late substitute in a 2–1 Ligue 2 loss to Dijon on 22 August 2022.

International career
Born in France, Nasraoui is of Tunisian descent. He was first called up to the Tunisia U20s for a set of friendlies in September 2022. He represented the Tunisia U20s in their winning campaign at the 2022 UNAF U-20 Tournament. He also made the squad for the 2023 Africa U-20 Cup of Nations.

Style of play
Nasraoui is primarily a left-back, but can also play as a left winger. He is a defensively solid player who is also a great passer.

Honours
Tunisia U20
UNAF U-20 Tournament: 2022 UNAF U-20 Tournament

References

External links
 

2003 births
Living people
Sportspeople from Montbéliard
French sportspeople of Tunisian descent
Tunisian footballers
French footballers
Association football forwards
Ligue 2 players
Championnat National 3 players
Nîmes Olympique players